La Font d'En Carròs is a municipality in the comarca of Safor in the Valencian Community, Spain.

Background

References

Font d'En Carros, La
Font d'En Carros, La